Grulla National Wildlife Refuge is located primarily in eastern New Mexico in Roosevelt County, southwest of the intersection of State Highway 88 and the Texas - New Mexico border about 25 miles southeast of Portales, New Mexico and southeast of the tiny community of Arch.  A very small part of the refuge extends eastward into western Bailey County, Texas.

The central focal point of the Grulla National Wildlife Refuge is an ephemeral salt lake or saline playa – a shallow basin that collects runoff from the surrounding drainage area during heavy downpours but then often dries completely due to evaporation.  This playa lake has been known by various names. Current USGS topographic maps and most commercially available maps of this region refer to this saline playa simply as "Salt Lake".  Back in the early 1880s, this playa was part of the DZ Ranch, and those familiar with the ranch often favor the name "DZ Lake".  The lake is also frequently called "Arch Lake" after the nearby community of Arch, New Mexico, located around 6 km to the northwest.

The word grulla is Spanish for crane.  When wet, the playa lake provides habitat to sandhill cranes and the grasslands within the refuge provide habitat to other birds such as ring-necked pheasants, lesser prairie chickens, and scaled quails.

The refuge has no facilities other than a parking lot and trails and is administered by Muleshoe National Wildlife Refuge in Texas.  It was often used in the mid 2000s as a training site for the Eastern New Mexico University cross country teams.

See also
Muleshoe National Wildlife Refuge
Blackwater Draw
Llano Estacado
Eastern New Mexico

References

External links
Grulla NWR Official Site
Bird Checklist for Grulla NWR
Photos of the Llano Estacado including Eastern New Mexico

National Wildlife Refuges in New Mexico
National Wildlife Refuges in Texas
Protected areas of Bailey County, Texas
Protected areas of Roosevelt County, New Mexico
Protected areas established in 1969
Saline lakes of the United States
Lakes of New Mexico
Lakes of Texas
Landforms of Bailey County, Texas
Bodies of water of Roosevelt County, New Mexico
1969 establishments in New Mexico
1969 establishments in Texas